The common parsley frog (Pelodytes punctatus) is a species of frog in the genus Pelodytes. It lives in the Iberian region in south-western Europe.

Description 
The common parsley frog (Pelodytes punctatus) is a very small and slender frog with long hindlegs, a flat head, and vertical pupils. Males tend to only reach 3.5 centimeters, whereas females are larger at 4.5 centimeters. The upper side of the body is variable in colour, usually with irregular green patches on a light brown, grey, or light olive background. Its earliest identification is believed to be from 1802. The frog's back is dotted with elongated warts, often in undulating longitudinal rows that can be orange along the flanks. Behind the protruding eyes and above the tympanum there is a short, small gland. It does not have parotid glands. The underside of the frog is white, and around the pelvis yellowy orange. They are fossorial, meaning they can live underground with limbs suited for burying and digging. In the mating season, males develop dark swellings on the insides of their digits and forelimbs, as well as on the chest. The males' forelimbs are stronger than the females. They are not completely cryptic like many other species but still are camouflaged in their environments. They have the ability to jump 50-70 centimeters in a single leap, and they are referred to as the "Mud-Jumper", or Modderkruiper, in Germany for this ability.

Taxonomy 
The common parsley frog (Pelodytes punctatus) is a member of the Polodytia family and Pelodytes genus. There is only a single genus within the pelodytia family, and there are more extinct species and genera than there are currently living today in the phylogenetic tree. Their close relatives include other parsley frogs (Pelodytes atlanticus), the Lusitanian parsley frog; (Pelodytes caucasicus), the Caucasian parsley frog; (Pelodytes hespericus), the Hesperides' parsley frog; and (Pelodytes ibericus – Iberian parsley frog) as well as European spadefoot toads and megophryidae.

Habitat and distribution 
These frogs can be found in France, Spain, Portugal, and a small part of Northwestern Italy (southern Piedmont and Liguria specifically). Their numbers are decreasing in Italy due to habitat changes that eliminate their breeding sites. They are also threatened and more at-risk in southern Spain and northern Portugal. There are other pelodytes species that inhabit similar regions, but earlier research and investigations differentiated the frogs into their unique species.

In terms of habitat altitude, these frogs reach from sea level to middle mountainous regions as high as 1,630-2,000 meters above sea level. Though they can live comfortably in that range, they prefer to breed at lower heights of around 60 to 460 meters above sea level.

The parsley frog’s habits differ from one ecological niche to another since they are heavily weather-dependent. Because of their diverse range and flexibility in egg-laying and mating habits, different local parsley frogs may not have the same date range as another frog that lives somewhere with a different weather pattern.

Behavior

Mating and behavior 
Pelodytes punctatus breed on a temporal schedule.They can breed twice a year, once in the autumn and once in the spring, and having two separate mating seasons is of evolutionary benefit to them since this increases their number of offspring. Otherwise, they would only be able to breed at one point each year. The flexibility in breeding patterns allows them to better adapt to differences in their environment. However, The ponds in which they breed are not necessarily the ponds that they go on to live in as adults.There are three models of breeding. In the opportunity strategy, the frogs may reproduce in both the spring and autumn months of a given year.In the contingent strategy, frogs will select a season to reproduce and stick with it year after year, even if it was not the season when they were born. In the bet-hedging strategy, they switch back and forth between autumn and spring breeding throughout their lives and several breeding seasons, depending on the environment and their own fitness at the time.

In France, the breeding season lasts from the end of February to early April; in Portugal, it is from November to March. In Andalusia, this parsley frog may spawn several times a year, and the bimodal mating can be seen in various other habitats as well. Parsley frogs generally tend to lay eggs following intense rainfall. If there is unnatural drought, they can postpone their breeding up to two months, from March to May. They often choose temporary ponds with aquatic plant life as their preferred breeding sites, and there is a positive, though weak, correlation between the depth of a pond and a P. punctatus’s preference to breed. They also prefer to lay eggs on aquatic vegetation that is submerged underwater. Area or openness of ponds is much more important to P. punctatus, and they prefer breeding ponds that have large areas. They also may prefer turbid waters to clear, but since that was only observed in one documented breeding season, there is not enough data that conclusively support that claim in the literature yet. Parsley frogs have been reported to breed in small streams or even in artificial reservoirs. These microhabitats are where the eggs are actually laid. They lay their eggs in a “zig-zag” pattern and have been observed to deposit over ten clutches.

The frogs’ breeding habitats are generally unpredictable due to their preferences, and since the ponds are temporary, vary from year to year. Mediterranean species prefer autumn reproductions, which may be regulated by air temperature and biological instinct in the frog. Tadpoles hatched in autumn months tend to fare better than those in the spring. This is potentially due to having extended time to develop through winter, less competition, and decreased predation.

Parsley frogs engage in amplexus, and female frogs can lay anywhere from 30 to 400 eggs.

Development and reproduction 
Metamorphosis can occur as early as January or February. In the metamorphosis process, parsley frogs exhibit phenotype plasticity, in part because their breeding habitats are so uncertain. There are different sizes and other physiological changes seen in some frogs of the same species. These changes are due to plasticity, or morphing into different phenotypes to best adapt to their unique environment. In ponds that are shallower or dry more quickly, different phenotypes or characteristics, are observed in the young frogs. Drier ponds actually yield a shorter larval period for the frogs. Eggs laid in ponds with consistent depth and then tadpoles living in that environment also generally have a larger body size, depth, tail length and depth, and tail fin length and depth. These differences do not impact the overall survival rate (6). Similar trends persist once the tadpoles metamorphose into toadlets, with the drier ponds producing overall smaller frogs. The different sizes do not impact survival, but could be responsible for other behaviors or aspects of the frogs’ lives (i.e, mating, fecundity). Terrestrial life for the frogs does not appear to be greatly impacted, other than the size differences aforementioned. Many other anuran species exhibit similar size and growth trends in related to drying environments, but the parsley frog’s actual morphological changes and the plasticity, or ability to change, are noteworthy as they are determined to be mostly plastic and not genetic or induced via mutations.

Tadpole behavior 
P. punctatus tadpoles are notoriously poor competitors. This is witnessed when they co-habitat with other species in the same ponds. The tail fin of tadpoles may become obsolete in shallower waters, so different morphologies of tadpoles may thrive in different environments even within the same species.

Adult behavior 
Regardless of tadpole environment or size, the jumping ability is relatively strong across the board for parsley frogs. Male frogs often tend to be sedentary and inhabit the same shelters in non-breeding times of the year, and return to the same locations over several years. Females live near males and seek them out in breeding seasons and when ready to mate.

The parsley frog’s habits differ from one ecological niche to another since they are heavily weather-dependent. Because of their diverse range and flexibility in egg-laying and mating habits, different local parsley frogs may not have the same date range as another frog that lives somewhere with a different weather pattern.

The parsley frog hibernates for shorter times than other anurans, and some southern species skip hibernation altogether. For the frogs that do hibernate, they generally enter hibernation after the fall breed and resume reproductive activities for spring breeds following.

Vocalizations 
Male parsley frogs utilize paired inner vocal sacs to croak underwater. They are fairly quiet in this process.  The males create a relatively quiet croaking noise with the help of their paired inner vocal sacs, underwater. Female frogs may respond with a "kee, kee" call. 

The parsley frog has been known to have differences in calls based on the region it lives in, size, or temperature. They have an elaborate calling system, but humans more than 300 meters away can hardly hear the quiet call. Calls can last for 1.5 to 3 full seconds. Larger sizes of the calling frog usually will lead to a longer call with a lower-pitched signal. Increased temperatures will do the opposite, quickening their signals. Most males do not submerge themselves in the water when calling, though some do.

Genetic diversity and plasticity 
In addition to plasticity, parsley frogs also exhibit a great deal of true genetic diversity. Several microsatellites have been mapped onto their alleles, and demonstrates that there are many different alleles present in their genetic field The microsatellites, or small repeats of DNA, that are mapped can indicate uniqueness, and ability to splice mRNA and other genetic material in different ways. Different splices can yield different phenotypes, and thus behaviors and characteristics. Recently, eight microsatellites were identified that can be considered important in the understanding of bimodal reproduction in autumn and spring. These markers can be used to understand how and why the frogs choose to breed and when.

Conservation

Climate change 
There used to be a larger concern for the survival of this species, but in recent years it has been determined that they are ranked at low risk for extinction. One large issue facing these frogs related to climate change is the introduction of invasive species, such as fish and crayfish. These new predators can create increased predation, decrease tadpole survival, and thus diminish Pelodytes punctatus numbers. The introduction of American crayfish Procambarus clarkii especially is an example of how invasive species can impact parsley frog behavior and life.

Pelodytes punctatus tadpoles have relatively high plasticity, as mentioned above. However, they have been impacted by changing ecosystems and the introduction of new and invasive species into their habitats. Native tadpole predators can include larval Aeshnid dragonflies, or other insects or animals they share habitat with. The invasive fish species, Gumbusia holbrooki, first appeared in their habitats near the Iberian peninsula several decades ago. There is also the American red swamp crayfish Procambarus clarkii. These invasive predators may have negative impacts on morphological development, studying tadpole growth and increasing rates of tadpole mortality. It only took 30 years for the frogs to exhibit physical changes after cohabitation with the crayfish. Parsley frogs also experienced behavioral changes in the presence of invasive fishes. Because of the recent introduction of invasive species, there is still co-evolution occurring and some scientists determined that there needs to be a longer period of co-habituation to fully determine the effect of the invasive species on the parsley frog tadpoles.

They also are occupying fewer ponds annually. From 1997 to 1999 alone, the Mediterranean ponds that typically housed their larvae decreased by nearly half. The biggest threat to their breeding pools is drying, which can be precipitated by man-made drainage of wetlands or construction work in their environments. They also face danger from fires for similar reasons of habitat or breeding ground destruction. The parsley frog has a relatively high ability to adapt and exhibit plasticity (see above breeding and early life behaviors). Because of this, they may be able to quickly shift into new ecosystems even in the face of climate change and shifting ecologies. This also can contribute to the frogs’ ability to adapt.

In captivity 
These frogs can potentially live well in captivity, but they were rarely kept as pets in the nineteenth century. There is little evidence to suggest that they are kept as pets today.

Legal protection 
The parsley frog is not critically endangered, but it is protected under law in Europe. There are several European laws that protect this frog: in France, The Berne Convention, Appendix III (1979); in Italy, Habitats Directive 1992/43/CEE; in Piedmont, Italy, Piedmont Regional Law 29/1984, Article I; and lastly in Linguria, Italy, Liguria Regional Law 4/1992, Article 11.

Because of the temporality of their breeding grounds, conservation efforts may be widespread and broad.

References 

Andreas Nöllert & Christel Nöllert: Die Amphibien Europas. Franckh-Kosmos, Stuttgart, 1992,

External links 
Species info. at Reptiles & aAmphibians of France
Images at www.herp.it
Images of Pelodytes ibericus at www.herp.it

Pelodytes
Amphibians described in 1802
Amphibians of Europe
Fauna of Portugal
Fauna of Italy
Taxa named by François Marie Daudin